HD 134439 and HD 134440 are a pair of K-type runaway stars, nearly hypervelocity stars, in the constellation Libra.

The stars are believed to originate from outside of the Milky Way, likely from a destroyed, unusually dusty satellite galaxy. They have an extremely low metallicity, only about 3.5% that of the Sun, with unusual chemical abundances very different from those of stars formed anywhere in the galaxy. Because of this, they are considered subdwarfs, and are less luminous than a main-sequence star of the same spectral type would be.

Binary system
Further adding to this, using Gaia data, HD 134440 appears to be  light years further than HD 134439, resulting in a true separation of  light years from each other. If they are orbiting each other, they would have an orbital period on the scale of  million years, making them one of the longest period binary systems known as well.

Destroyed planet
In a 2018 study, it was found that HD 134440 had a noticeably higher metallicity than HD 134439, which could be potentially explained by the star having engulfed a planet orbiting it, suggesting that it may be possible for planets to form even around stars with extremely low content of planet-forming material.

References

K-type subdwarfs
0579.2
074234/5
High-proper-motion stars
134439/40
Libra (constellation)
Extragalactic stars